Lovellona elongata is a species of sea snail, a marine gastropod mollusk in the family Mitromorphidae.

Description
The shell size attains 7.5 mm

Distribution
This marine species occurs off Wakayama, Honshu, Japan.

References

 Chino M. & Stahlschmidt P. (2009) New turrid species of the Mitromorpha-complex (Gastropoda: Conidae: Clathurellinae) from the Philippines and Japan. Visaya 2(4): 63–82.

External links
 
 MNHN, Paris: Lovellona elongata (paratype)

elongata
Gastropods described in 2009